Bracht is a surname. Notable people with the surname include:

Charles Bracht (1915–1978), Belgian alpine skier
Erich Franz Eugen Bracht (1882–1969), German pathologist and gynaecologist
Eugen Bracht (1842–1921), German landscape painter
Frank Bracht (1910–1985), American film and music editor
Franz Bracht (1877–1933), German jurist and politician
Fritz Bracht (1899–1945), Nazi Gauleiter of Upper Silesia
Helmut Bracht (1929–2011), German footballer
Kai Bracht (born 1978), retired German ski jumper
Timo Bracht (born 1975) German Athlete who competed in triathlon
Travis Bracht, American singer and guitarist 
Uwe Bracht (1953–2016), German football player